The 1999 NASCAR Busch Series began on February 13 and ended on November 13. Dale Earnhardt Jr. of Dale Earnhardt, Inc. won the season points championship for the second year in a row.

Teams and drivers 
List of full-time teams at the start of 1999.

Races

NAPA Auto Parts 300 

The NAPA Auto Parts 300 was held February 13 at Daytona International Speedway. Ken Schrader was the polesitter. On the last lap, Casey Atwood was tapped by Andy Hillenburg into the outside retaining wall. Atwood continued to go across the tri-oval on his roof. Atwood flipped 4 times, but emerged from his Chevrolet unscathed. The race was broadcast on CBS.

Top ten results

1-Randy LaJoie
32-Jeff Green
18-Andy Hillenburg
17-Matt Kenseth
8-Bobby Hillin Jr.
45-Adam Petty
99-Kevin Lepage
37-Kevin Grubb
9-Jeff Burton
90-Brad Loney

Failed to qualify: Hank Parker Jr. (#53), Derrike Cope (#61), Kelly Denton (#75), Morgan Shepherd (#07), Wayne Grubb (#83), Jeff Krogh (#56), Mike Garvey (#09), Skip Smith (#67), Shane Hall (#43), Mark Krogh (#80), Mike Stefanik (#05), Mark Day (#16), Blaise Alexander (#20), Ed Berrier (#77), Hermie Sadler (#72), Freddie Query (#68), Jeff McClure (#13), Brett Bodine (#54), Jim Bown (#51), Joe Bessey (#6), Lance Hooper (#23), Loy Allen Jr. (#78)

Alltel 200 

The Alltel 200 was held February 20 at North Carolina Speedway. Dale Earnhardt Jr. was the polesitter. The race was broadcast on TNN.

Top ten results

9-Jeff Burton
60-Mark Martin
17-Matt Kenseth
1-Randy LaJoie
27-Casey Atwood
34-Mike McLaughlin
98-Elton Sawyer
64-Geoff Bodine
66-Todd Bodine
36-Tim Fedewa

Failed to qualify: Adam Petty (#45), Freddie Query (#68), Brad Loney (#90), David Green (#41), Glenn Allen Jr. (#38), Philip Morris (#01), Jeff Green (#32), Mario Gosselin (#58), Dick Trickle (#5), Jeff Finley (#25), Bryan Wall (#73), Mike Skinner (#19), Bobby Labonte (#44), Jimmy Kitchens (#22)

Sam's Town 300 

The Sam's Town 300 was held March 6 at Las Vegas Motor Speedway. Mark Martin was the pole sitter. The race was broadcast on ESPN.

Top ten results

60-Mark Martin
87-Joe Nemechek
9-Jeff Burton
24-Jeff Gordon
12-Jimmy Spencer
3-Dale Earnhardt Jr.
47-Elliott Sadler
32-Jeff Green
99-Kevin Lepage
57-Jason Keller

Failed to qualify: Casey Atwood (#27), Glenn Allen Jr. (#38), Brad Loney (#90), Mike Dillon (#59), Ted Musgrave (#29), Joe Buford (#7), Larry Pearson (#00), Jeff Finley (#25), Shane Hall (#43), Ed Berrier (#77), Jimmy Kitchens (#22), Kevin Grubb (#37), Freddie Query (#68), Wayne Grubb (#83), Bobby Hillin Jr. (#8), Bryan Wall (#73), Hermie Sadler (#72), Eric Jones (#70), Morgan Shepherd (#07), Mark Krogh (#80), Jerry Glanville (#81), Bobby Hamilton Jr. (#95)

Yellow Freight 300 

The Yellow Freight 300 was held March 13 at Atlanta Motor Speedway. Dave Blaney was the polesitter. The race came under controversy when winner Mike Skinner was disqualified and the win was given to Blaney. But after a further review, NASCAR reversed its decision and re-awarded the victory to Skinner. The race was broadcast on ESPN.

Top ten results

19-Mike Skinner
93-Dave Blaney
3-Dale Earnhardt Jr.
99-Kevin Lepage
66-Todd Bodine
60-Mark Martin
64-Geoff Bodine
98-Elton Sawyer
38-Glenn Allen Jr.
50-Mark Green

Failed to qualify: Andy Kirby (#28), Tim Fedewa (#36), Freddie Query (#68), Hermie Sadler (#72), Bobby Hamilton Jr. (#95), Jeff Finley (#25), Shane Hall (#43), Brad Loney (#90), Jeff Fuller (#89), J. D. Gibbs (#18), Kevin Grubb (#37), Mark Day (#16)

Diamond Hill Plywood 200 

The Diamond Hill Plywood 200 was held March 20 at Darlington Raceway. Mark Martin was the polesitter. The race was broadcast on ESPN.

Top ten results

17-Matt Kenseth
98-Elton Sawyer
10-Phil Parsons
44-Terry Labonte
99-Kevin Lepage
9-Jeff Burton
41-David Green
36-Tim Fedewa
21-Michael Waltrip
66-Todd Bodine

Failed to qualify: Jim Bown (#51), Lyndon Amick (#35), Andy Kirby (#28), Jeff Finley (#25), Freddie Query (#68), Mark Krogh (#80), Kerry Earnhardt (#40), Jimmy Kitchens (#22), Kevin Grubb (#37) Bobby Labonte (#18)

Coca-Cola 300 

The Coca-Cola 300 was held March 27 at Texas Motor Speedway. Dave Blaney won the pole. The race was shortened to 163 laps due to rain.  The race was broadcast on CBS and switched to TNN midway through the race.

Top ten results

60-Mark Martin
9-Jeff Burton
32-Jeff Green
34-Mike McLaughlin
11-Kenny Irwin Jr.
57-Jason Keller
15-Ken Schrader
93-Dave Blaney
19-Mike Skinner
3-Dale Earnhardt Jr.

Failed to qualify: Ed Berrier (#77), Andy Kirby (#28), Sterling Marlin (#42), Dick Trickle (#5), Jimmy Spencer (#12), Philip Morris (#01), Steve Park (#83), Shane Hall (#43), Stanton Barrett (#40), Brad Loney (#90), Jason Jarrett (#33), Jimmy Kitchens (#22), Mark Day (#16), Joe Buford (#7), Kenny Wallace (#25), Mark Krogh (#80), Bobby Hamilton Jr. (#95)

BellSouth Mobility 320 

The BellSouth Mobility 320 was held April 3 at Nashville Speedway USA. Dale Earnhardt Jr. won the pole.  The race was broadcast on CBS.

Top ten results

32-Jeff Green
27-Casey Atwood
57-Jason Keller
87-Joe Nemechek
66-Todd Bodine
4-Jeff Purvis
34-Mike McLaughlin
98-Elton Sawyer
3-Dale Earnhardt Jr.
10-Phil Parsons

Failed to qualify: J. D. Gibbs (#18), Freddie Query (#68), Scot Walters (#83), Lyndon Amick (#35), Shane Hall (#43), Brad Baker (#7), Chad Chaffin (#84), Donnie Moran (#58), Mark Day (#16), Bobby Hamilton Jr. (#95), Chris Cook (#65)

Moore's Snacks 250 

The Moore's Snacks 250 was held April 10 at Bristol Motor Speedway. Jason Keller won the pole.  The race was broadcast on ESPN.

Top ten results

57-Jason Keller
3-Dale Earnhardt Jr.
98-Elton Sawyer
44-Terry Labonte
66-Todd Bodine
25-Kenny Wallace
37-Kevin Grubb
14-Sterling Marlin
36-Tim Fedewa
61-Tony Roper

Failed to qualify: Ted Christopher (#13), Freddie Query (#68), Gary Bradberry (#86), Jason Jarrett (#33), Hermie Sadler (#72), Kelly Denton (#75), Curtis Markham (#83), Elliott Sadler (#47)

Touchstone Energy 300 

The Touchstone Energy 300 was held April 24 at Talladega Superspeedway. Ken Schrader won the pole. The Big One happened midway in the race, with pole-sitter Schrader crashing and erupting in flames in Turn 1, also taking many other cars out. Schrader was uninjured. Terry Labonte would just barely edge Joe Nemechek in the closest finish of NASCAR Busch Series history.  The race was broadcast on ABC.

Top ten results

44-Terry Labonte
87-Joe Nemechek
4-Jeff Purvis
17-Matt Kenseth
35-Lyndon Amick
3-Dale Earnhardt Jr.
00-Larry Pearson
27-Casey Atwood
1-Randy LaJoie
41-David Green

Failed to qualify: Andy Kirby (#28), Mark Martin (#60), Loy Allen (#78), Hermie Sadler (#72), Skip Smith (#67), Joe Bessey (#6), Stevie Reeves (#25), Freddie Query (#68)

 This was the first Busch Series race in which veteran driver Mark Martin had failed to qualify for since February 1993.
 Elton Sawyer entered this race with a microscopic 1 point lead in Busch Series standings, but due to engine troubles just 15 laps into the race, Sawyer had to drop out of the race, causing him to drop from first in points to third with a 114-point deficit to new standings leader Dale Earnhardt Jr.

Auto Club 300 

The Auto Club 300 was held May 1 at California Speedway. Dale Earnhardt Jr. won the pole.  The race was broadcast on ABC and switched to ESPN2 except on the West Coast with 9 laps to go due to the race running into ABC's broadcasting window of the 125th Kentucky Derby.

Top ten results

17-Matt Kenseth
9-Jeff Burton
3-Dale Earnhardt Jr.
45-Adam Petty
47-Elliott Sadler
36-Tim Fedewa
98-Elton Sawyer
21-Michael Waltrip
35-Lyndon Amick
77-Ed Berrier

Failed to qualify: Jimmy Kitchens (#22), Stevie Reeves (#25), Kenny Irwin Jr. (#11), Curtis Markham (#83), Jerry Glanville (#81), Brett Bodine (#54), Shane Hall (#43), Andy Kirby (#28), Sterling Marlin (#42), Ward Burton (#02)

Busch 200 

The Busch 200 was held May 8 at New Hampshire International Speedway. Jeff Green won the pole.  The race was broadcast on TNN.

Top ten results

98-Elton Sawyer
32-Jeff Green
4-Jeff Purvis
1-Randy LaJoie
27-Casey Atwood
57-Jason Keller
72-Hermie Sadler
17-Matt Kenseth
66-Todd Bodine
77-Ed Berrier
This was Elton Sawyer's last career NASCAR victory.

Failed to qualify: Bobby Dotter (#08), Wayne Grubb (#83), Joe Bessey (#6), Bryan Wall (#73)

Hardee's 250 

The Hardee's 250 was held May 14 at Richmond International Raceway. Jason Keller won the pole.  The race was broadcast on ESPN2.

Top ten results

60-Mark Martin
9-Jeff Burton
17-Matt Kenseth
66-Todd Bodine
32-Jeff Green
15-Ken Schrader
25-Kenny Wallace
21-Michael Waltrip
4-Jeff Purvis
93-Dave Blaney

Failed to qualify: R. D. Smith (#79), Ted Christopher (#13), Geoff Bodine (#64), Terry Labonte (#44), Chad Chaffin (#84), Philip Morris (#01), Brad Baker (#7), Andy Kirby (#28), Brad Loney (#90), Freddie Query (#68), Jeff Finley (#65), Jason Rudd (#81), Bobby Hamilton Jr. (#95), Johnny Benson (#33)

First Union 200 

The First Union 200 was held May 23 at Nazareth Speedway. Jeff Green won the pole. The race was shortened to 168 laps due to darkness.  The race was broadcast on ESPN2.

Top ten results

17-Matt Kenseth
3-Dale Earnhardt Jr.
36-Tim Fedewa
93-Dave Blaney
45-Adam Petty
4-Jeff Purvis
32-Jeff Green
13-Ted Christopher
10-Phil Parsons
53-Hank Parker Jr.

Failed to qualify: Wayne Grubb (#83), Joey McCarthy (#41), Chad Chaffin (#84), J. D. Gibbs (#8N), Andy Kirby (#28), Bryan Wall (#77N), Dennis Demers (#86N), Mike Olsen (#61N)

Carquest Auto Parts 300 

The Carquest Auto Parts 300 was held May 29 at Lowe's Motor Speedway. David Green won the pole. The race was broadcast on TBS.

Top ten results

60-Mark Martin
3-Dale Earnhardt Jr.
17-Matt Kenseth
9-Jeff Burton
21-Michael Waltrip
54-Brett Bodine
63-Chuck Bown
98-Elton Sawyer
66-Todd Bodine
32-Jeff Green

Failed to qualify: Terry Labonte (#44), Glenn Allen Jr. (#38), Jerry Nadeau (#90), Geoff Bodine (#64), Mike Wallace (#33), Bobby Hillin Jr. (#8), Philip Morris (#01), Jeff Fuller (#89), Kenny Irwin Jr. (#11), Tony Roper (#61), Larry Pearson (#00), Ed Berrier (#77), Mike Dillon (#59), Jim Bown (#65), Steve Grissom (#22), Lyndon Amick (#35), Andy Kirby (#28), Nathan Buttke (#30), Joe Buford (#7), Jeff Krogh (#56), Jimmy Kitchens (#55), Doug Reid III (#97)

MBNA Platinum 200 

The MBNA Platinum 200 was held June 5 at Dover International Speedway. Dick Trickle won the pole. The race was broadcast on TNN.

Top ten results

3-Dale Earnhardt Jr.
02-Ward Burton
66-Todd Bodine
41-David Green
5-Dick Trickle
37-Kevin Grubb
32-Jeff Green
93-Dave Blaney
98-Elton Sawyer
57-Jason Keller

Failed to qualify: Andy Santerre (#47), Jerry Glanville (#81), Brad Loney (#90), Hermie Sadler (#72), Joey McCarthy (#41), John Preston (#12), Hank Parker Jr. (#53), Lyndon Amick (#35)

Textilease/Medique 300 

The Textilease/Medique 300 was held June 12 at South Boston Speedway. Dale Earnhardt Jr. won the pole. This was the last career NASCAR race for Chuck Bown and Larry Pearson.  The race was broadcast on TNN.

Top ten results

3-Dale Earnhardt Jr.
32-Jeff Green
53-Hank Parker Jr.
4-Jeff Purvis
36-Tim Fedewa
17-Matt Kenseth
01-Philip Morris
61-Tony Roper
74-Tony Raines
27-Casey Atwood

Failed to qualify: Greg Marlowe (#92), Jeff Krogh (#56), R. D. Smith (#79), Curtis Markham (#33), Andy Santerre (#47), Stanton Barrett (#40), Shane Hall (#43), Glenn Allen Jr. (#38), Ed Berrier (#77), Andy Kirby (#28)

Lysol 200 

The Lysol 200 was held June 27 at Watkins Glen International. Ron Fellows won the pole.   The race was broadcast on ESPN.

Top ten results

3-Dale Earnhardt Jr.
87-Ron Fellows
34-Mike McLaughlin
12-Jack Baldwin
57-Jason Keller
40-Butch Miller
59-Mike Dillon
93-Dave Blaney
66-Todd Bodine
53-Hank Parker Jr.

Failed to qualify: Jeff Krogh (#56), Eric Bodine (#21N), Stacy Compton (#28), J. D. Gibbs (#8N), Louis Rettenmeier (#59N), Ted Christopher (#13)

DieHard 250 

The DieHard 250 was held July 4 at The Milwaukee Mile. Casey Atwood won the pole. During the final practice for this race, Jeff Krogh crashed and suffered near-fatal injuries. He has since recovered, although he has not run a NASCAR race since.  This was Casey Atwood's first career Busch Series victory as he moved Jeff Green out of the way on the final turn of the final lap.  The race was broadcast on TNN.

Top ten results

27-Casey Atwood
32-Jeff Green
3-Dale Earnhardt Jr.
38-Glenn Allen Jr.
17-Matt Kenseth
93-Dave Blaney
92-Jimmie Johnson
66-Todd Bodine
5-Dick Trickle
61-Tony Roper

Failed to qualify: Mario Gosselin (#15), Bobby Dotter (#08), Rick Beebe (#82), Dennis Setzer (#11), Stacy Compton (#19), Jerry Glanville (#81), Mel Walen (#58), Brad Loney (#90)

Myrtle Beach 250 

The Myrtle Beach 250 was held July 17 at Myrtle Beach Speedway. Dale Earnhardt Jr. won the pole.  The race was broadcast on TNN.

Top ten results

32-Jeff Green
1-Randy LaJoie
17-Matt Kenseth
43-Shane Hall
90-Brad Loney
66-Todd Bodine
98-Elton Sawyer
57-Jason Keller
10-Phil Parsons
4-Jeff Purvis

Failed to qualify: Philip Morris (#01), Glenn Allen Jr. (#38), Chad Chaffin (#84), Mark Green (#50), Andy Santerre (#47), Curtis Markham (#72), Adam Petty (#45), Bobby Hamilton Jr. (#63), Mario Gosselin (#58), Greg Marlowe (#92), Andy Kirby (#28), Kevin Grubb (#37), Ed Spencer III (#12), R. D. Smith (#79)

NAPA Autocare 250 

The NAPA Autocare 250 was held July 24 at Pikes Peak International Raceway. Dave Blaney won the pole.  The race was broadcast on ESPN.

Top ten results

47-Andy Santerre
36-Tim Fedewa
66-Todd Bodine
32-Jeff Green
4-Jeff Purvis
5-Dick Trickle
17-Matt Kenseth
98-Elton Sawyer
27-Casey Atwood
10-Phil Parsons

Failed to qualify: Scott Gaylord (#52), Jerry Glanville (#81), Chad Chaffin (#16)

Carquest Auto Parts 250 

The Carquest Auto Parts 250 was held July 31 at Gateway International Raceway. Casey Atwood won the pole.  The race was broadcast on TNN.

Top ten results

3-Dale Earnhardt Jr.
1-Randy LaJoie
87-Joe Nemechek
32-Jeff Green
57-Jason Keller
17-Matt Kenseth
27-Casey Atwood
93-Dave Blaney
34-Mike McLaughlin
66-Todd Bodine

Failed to qualify: Gary Bradberry (#28), Ted Smokstad (#19), Eric Jones (#70), Gus Wasson (#96), Mel Walen (#58), Lyndon Amick (#35)

Kroger 200 presented by Fifth Third Bank 

The Kroger 200 was held August 6 at Indianapolis Raceway Park. Jason Keller won the pole.  The race was broadcast on ESPN.

Top ten results

57-Jason Keller
66-Todd Bodine
32-Jeff Green
17-Matt Kenseth
3-Dale Earnhardt Jr.
4-Jeff Purvis
36-Tim Fedewa
98-Elton Sawyer
40-Butch Miller
74-Tony Raines

Failed to qualify: Brad Baker (#7), Brad Loney (#90), Tony Roper (#61), D.J. Hoelzle (#55), Greg Marlowe (#92), Gus Wasson (#96)

NAPA 200 

The NAPA 200 was held August 21 at Michigan International Speedway. Dave Blaney won the pole. During a practice session for this race, Ernie Irvan crashed in turn 4 and suffered serious injuries. This forced him into early retirement.  The race was broadcast on ESPN.

Top ten results

3-Dale Earnhardt Jr.
24-Jeff Gordon
93-Dave Blaney
02-Ward Burton
60-Mark Martin
21-Michael Waltrip
9-Jeff Burton
12-Jimmy Spencer
77-Kevin Lepage
4-Jeff Purvis

Failed to qualify: Curtis Markham (#72), Ted Musgrave (#82), Hank Parker Jr. (#53), Phil Parsons (#10), Tony Roper (#61), Tim Fedewa (#36), Bobby Hillin Jr. (#8), Butch Miller (#40), Wayne Grubb (#83), Greg Sacks (#90), Ricky Craven (#47), Chad Chaffin (#16), Glenn Allen Jr. (#38), Ernie Irvan (#84), Gus Wasson (#96), Ted Christopher (#13), Matt Hutter (#99)

Food City 250 

The Food City 250 was held August 27 at Bristol Motor Speedway. Jeff Green won the pole.  The race was broadcast on ESPN2.

Top ten results

17-Matt Kenseth
21-Michael Waltrip
3-Dale Earnhardt Jr.
14-Sterling Marlin
66-Todd Bodine
25-Kenny Wallace
98-Elton Sawyer
44-Terry Labonte
93-Dave Blaney
8-Bobby Hillin Jr.

Failed to qualify: Steve Grissom (#22), Kevin Lepage (#99), Tony Roper (#61), Hermie Sadler (#33), Kenny Irwin Jr. (#11), Bobby Hamilton Jr. (#63), Butch Miller (#40), Glenn Allen Jr. (#38), Hank Parker Jr. (#53), Carl Long (#95), Kelly Denton (#75), Kerry Earnhardt (#76)

Dura Lube 200 

The Dura Lube 200 was held September 4 at Darlington Raceway. Ward Burton won the pole.  The race was broadcast on ESPN2.

Top ten results

60-Mark Martin
93-Dave Blaney
17-Matt Kenseth
02-Ward Burton
87-Joe Nemechek
25-Kenny Wallace
9-Jeff Burton
4-Jeff Purvis
14-Sterling Marlin
66-Todd Bodine

Failed to qualify: Hermie Sadler (#33), Ted Musgrave (#40), Kevin Harvick (#2), Terry Labonte (#44), Greg Sacks (#90), Curtis Markham (#72), Andy Santerre (#47), Lyndon Amick (#88), Ed Berrier (#55), Kerry Earnhardt (#7), Tom Hubert (#15)

Autolite Platinum 250 

The Autolite Platinum 250 was held September 10 at Richmond International Raceway. Jeff Burton won the pole.  The race was broadcast on ESPN.

Top ten results

3-Dale Earnhardt Jr.
60-Mark Martin
12-Jimmy Spencer
25-Kenny Wallace
37-Kevin Grubb
35-Elliott Sadler
41-David Green
4-Jeff Purvis
77-Chad Chaffin
57-Jason Keller

Failed to qualify: Michael Waltrip (#21), Ricky Hendrick (#24), Brett Bodine (#54), Brad Loney (#90), Michael Ritch (#55), Kenny Irwin Jr. (#11), Philip Morris (#01), Hut Stricklin (#38), Ted Christopher (#13), R. D. Smith (#79), Jason Rudd (#81), Jimmy Kitchens (#7), Jason White (#28), Mario Gosselin (#58), Hal Goodson (#39), Hank Parker Jr. (#53)

MBNA Gold 200 

The MBNA Gold 200 was held September 25 at Dover International Speedway. Matt Kenseth won the pole. The race was broadcast on TNN.

Top ten results

27-Casey Atwood
1-Randy LaJoie
32-Jeff Green
74-Tony Raines
11-Kenny Irwin Jr.
25-Kenny Wallace
46-David Green
10-Phil Parsons
34-Mike McLaughlin
00-Buckshot Jones

Failed to qualify: Jason Leffler (#18), Kelly Denton (#75), Lance Hooper (#23), Rich Bickle (#63), Joey McCarthy (#41), Michael Ritch (#55), Ted Christopher (#13), Jimmy Kitchens (#7), Ken Alexander (#03)

All Pro Bumper to Bumper 300 

The All Pro Bumper to Bumper 300 was held October 9 at Lowe's Motor Speedway. Matt Kenseth won the pole.  The race was broadcast on TBS.

Top ten results

21-Michael Waltrip
24-Jeff Gordon
34-Mike McLaughlin
12-Jimmy Spencer
3-Dale Earnhardt Jr.
02-Ward Burton
17-Matt Kenseth
87-Joe Nemechek
66-Todd Bodine
19-Mike Skinner

Failed to qualify: Brett Bodine (#54), Hermie Sadler (#47), Curtis Markham (#72), Kelly Denton (#75), Rich Bickle (#91), Robert Pressley (#61), Ken Schrader (#15), Bobby Hillin Jr. (#8), Chad Chaffin (#77), Kenny Irwin Jr. (#11), Derrike Cope (#89), Ed Berrier (#78), Mike Garvey (#09), Elliott Sadler (#35), Morgan Shepherd (#7), Wayne Grubb (#83), Joe Buford (#95), Kevin Schwantz (#65), Gary Bradberry (#86), Adam Petty (#45)

Kmart 200 

The Kmart 200 was held October 23 at North Carolina Speedway. Mark Martin won the pole.  The race was broadcast on TNN.

Top ten results

60-Mark Martin
32-Jeff Green
93-Dave Blaney
17-Matt Kenseth
66-Todd Bodine
33-Johnny Benson
25-Kenny Wallace
57-Jason Keller
41-David Green
61-Morgan Shepherd

Failed to qualify: Hut Stricklin (#38), Ken Schrader (#15), Sterling Marlin (#14), Rich Bickle (#91), Lance Hooper (#23), Jimmy Hensley (#83), Mike Borkowski (#02), Hermie Sadler (#47), Johnny Chapman (#73), Greg Biffle (#19), Ed Berrier (#63), Kelly Moore (#48), Mike Laughlin Jr. (#94), Philip Morris (#01)

Sam's Town 250 

The inaugural Sam's Town 250 was held October 30 at Memphis Motorsports Park. Jeff Green won the pole.  The race was broadcast on TNN.

Top ten results

32-Jeff Green
3-Dale Earnhardt Jr.
98-Elton Sawyer
66-Todd Bodine
45-Adam Petty
5-Dick Trickle
34-Mike McLaughlin
37-Kevin Grubb
36-Tim Fedewa
35-Lyndon Amick

Failed to qualify: J. D. Gibbs (#42), Jimmy Spencer (#12), Jimmy Morales (#82), Kenny Wallace (#25), Brad Baker (#7), Ricky Hendrick (#24), Joe Buford (#67), Brian Smith (#76), R. D. Smith (#13), Kevin Lepage (#99), Sean Studer (#68), Ron Young (#71), Kelly Moore (#48), Kevin Ray (#95), Mike Garvey (#09), Kelly Denton (#75)

Outback Steakhouse 200 

The inaugural Outback Steakhouse 200 was held November 6 at Phoenix International Raceway. Ken Schrader won the pole. The race was broadcast on TNN.

Top ten results

24-Jeff Gordon
3-Dale Earnhardt Jr.
12-Jimmy Spencer
9-Jeff Burton
25-Kenny Wallace
31-Ron Hornaday Jr.
15-Ken Schrader
17-Matt Kenseth
66-Todd Bodine
00-Buckshot Jones

Failed to qualify: Joe Nemechek (#87), Bobby Hamilton (#80), Jimmy Hensley (#83), Greg Sacks (#90), Jimmy Morales (#14), Dave Steele (#82), Damon Lusk (#70)

 First win for Gordon-Evernham Motorsports. This was also the only win with Ray Evernham as co-owner. Evernham would sell his half of the team at seasons end to go develop his own team with Dodge for the 2001 Winston Cup season. Rick Hendrick bought Evernham's share and the team was renamed to JG Motorsports for 2000.

HotWheels.com 300 

The HotWheels.com 300 was held November 13 at Homestead-Miami Speedway. Hut Stricklin won the pole.  The race was broadcast on NBC, NBC's first Busch Series telecast.

Top ten results

87-Joe Nemechek
3-Dale Earnhardt Jr.
12-Jimmy Spencer
53-Hank Parker Jr.
32-Jeff Green
99-Kevin Lepage
41-David Green
9-Jeff Burton
22-Bobby Hamilton Jr.
02-Ward Burton

Failed to qualify: Mike Garvey (#09), Greg Sacks (#90), Ron Young (#71), Ted Christopher (#28), John Preston (#89), Bobby Hamilton (#80), Morgan Shepherd (#76), Barry Bodine (#6), Steve Park (#84), Wayne Grubb (#83), Mark Green (#50), Sean Studer (#68), Joe Buford (#7), Jimmy Morales (#82), Randy MacDonald (#54), Curtis Markham (#63), Andy Santerre (#44), Kevin Grubb (#37), Johnny Chapman (#73), Derek Gilcrest (#15)

Full Drivers' Championship

(key) Bold – Pole position awarded by time. Italics – Pole position set by owner's points. * – Most laps led.

Rookie of the Year 
The winner of the 1999 rookie battle was Tony Raines, a former American Speed Association champion. He had three top-ten finishes en route to a twelfth-place finish in points. Hank Parker Jr. was the runner-up, while fourth-generation driver and preseason favorite Adam Petty struggled with consistency and finished third. Bobby Hamilton Jr. and Tony Roper spent the season bouncing from ride to ride, and were unable to make a strong threat for the award. Kelly Denton, Philip Morris, Kerry Earnhardt, and Skip Smith all declared for the ROTY award, but could not mount a full-season attempt.

See also 
 1999 NASCAR Winston Cup Series
 1999 NASCAR Craftsman Truck Series

External links 
Busch Series Standings and Statistics for 1999

NASCAR Xfinity Series seasons